Fernando Elias Oliveira da Silva, known as Elias (born 20 November 1963) is a former Portuguese football player.

Club career
He played 8 seasons and 200 games in the Primeira Liga for Penafiel, Estrela Amadora and Tirsense.

Honours
Estrela Amadora
Taça de Portugal: 1989–90

References

External links
 

1963 births
People from Paredes, Portugal
Living people
Portuguese footballers
Association football midfielders
F.C. Penafiel players
Liga Portugal 2 players
Primeira Liga players
C.F. Estrela da Amadora players
F.C. Tirsense players
Sportspeople from Porto District